Mahmud, in Iran, may refer to:
 Mahmud, Khuzestan
 Mahmud, South Khorasan